Kahuiyeh may refer to:
 Kahuiyeh, Kerman
 Kahuiyeh-ye Olya, Baft County